Little Summer Island is an island in Lake Michigan. It is located in Fairbanks Township, in Delta County, Michigan.  It was logged extensively in the late 1800s.

Other islands in the chain are from north to south
Little Summer Island
Summer Island
Poverty Island
Gull Island
St. Martin Island
Rock Island
Washington Island
Pilot Island
Detroit Island
Plum Island

Notes

Islands of Delta County, Michigan
Islands of Lake Michigan in Michigan